Catocala mesopotamica is a moth of the family Erebidae first described by Nikolai Yakovlevich Kuznetsov in 1903. It is found in Turkey.

References

mesopotamica
Endemic fauna of Turkey
Moths described in 1903
Moths of Asia